Gangbé! is a 2018 Beninese musical documentary film directed by Arnaud Robert and produced by Aline Schmid for Intermezzo Films. 

The film is based on journey of Gangbé Brass Band, a 10-member Beninese musical band excelled with West African jùjú and traditional Vodou music with Western jazz and big-band sounds, on the road to Lagos to perform with Femi Kuti at the Shrine. The film received critical reviews from critics.

References

External links
 
 Gangbé! in YouTube
 Gangbe Afrobeats

2015 films
Beninese documentary films
2015 documentary films